Ushakovo is a rural locality (a village) in Muromtsevskoye Rural Settlement, Sudogodsky District, Vladimir Oblast, Russia. The population was 4 as of 2010.

Geography 
Ushakovo is located 7 km west of Sudogda (the district's administrative centre) by road. Stepachevo is the nearest rural locality.

References 

Rural localities in Sudogodsky District